Bayleaf may refer to:

 Bay leaf, a leaf of the bay laurel
 Bayleaf (album), an album by Stone Gossard
 RFA Bayleaf, three ships of the Royal Fleet Auxiliary
 Bayleaf farmhouse, a historic building at the Weald and Downland Open Air Museum, Singleton, Sussex, England
 Bayleef, a fictional character in the Pokémon franchise
 Bayleaf the Gardener, a fictional character in the UK children's TV programme The Herbs